The Madrid autonomous football team is the regional football team for the Community of Madrid, Spain. They are not affiliated with FIFA or UEFA, because the Community of Madrid is represented internationally by the Spain national football team. The team plays only friendly matches.

History

Prince of Asturias Cup
In the first half of the 20th century, the Regional Centro Football Federation (which encompassed Madrid and the wider Castile region, and organised the Campeonato Regional Centro for the local clubs) selected a representative team for friendly matches, and also participated in the inter-regional Prince of Asturias Cup, winning the competition on two occasions (1917 and 1918) when they were hosts. Due to incompetence of some federative leaders, the calendar of the 1917 tournament was allowed to be played on the same week as the 1917 Copa del Rey Final between Madrid FC and Arenas, something that prevented the Centro team from having the best players of Madrid FC, thus they had to sent players from the likes of Athletic Madrid and Racing de Madrid to form a team which could compete. As a result, this side included lesser known players such as Joaquín Pascual, Ezequiel Montero, Sócrates Quintana, José Agüero, Miguel Mieg and Saturno Villaverde and captain José María Castell, who was the only player of Madrid FC in the squad. Despite being a weaker side than in the previous tournaments, they managed to win the tournament for the first time in the team's history, with the then unknown Saturnino being the star of the tournament with three goals - a brace against Catalonia in a 2-2 draw and the winner against Cantabric in a 3-2 win - while Mieg and Agüero scored the goals of the decisive game against Catalonia. In the 1918 edition, they were set up to face Cantabric in a two-legged final, and Centro won both games by an aggregate score of 6-3, with the Castilian goalscorers being Feliciano Rey, Gomar, José María Sansinenea (2) and Ramón Olalquiaga (2).

They also had a memorable campaign in the 1923–24 Prince of Asturias Cup, where they beat Galicia 1-0 in the quarter-finals just as Galicia had done to them in the quarter-finals of the previous edition, and then defeated the South team 2-1 in the semi-finals thanks to a brace from Juan Monjardín, and in the final against Catalonia Monjardín appeared to have been the hero once more when he scored early at the beginning of extra time to put Madrid 4-3 up, but with two minutes remaining Sagi-Barba leveled the scores at 4-4, forcing a replay in which Monjardín scored twice, but his efforts were in vain as Catalonia ran 3-2 winners.

Stagnation
The Centro Federation evolved into the Castilian Football Federation in the 1930s, and into the Madrid Federation in the 1980s; both organisations considered themselves to be the successor to Centro, using its 1913 foundation date as the basis for their celebrations of a 50th Anniversary in 1963 and 100th Anniversary in 2013, including special fixtures featuring a regional representative squad.

Match history

Results

Table

Honours
Prince of Asturias Cup:
Champions (2): 1917 and 1918
Runners-up (2): 1916 and 1924

Notable players
 Bernabéu
 René Petit
 Juan Monjardín
 Ferenc Puskás

See also
:Category:Footballers from the Community of Madrid

References

External links
Official website

Spanish autonomous football teams
Football in the Community of Madrid